Elizabeth I (1533–1603) was Queen of England and Ireland from 1558 to 1603.

Elizabeth I may also refer to:
 Elizabeth I (2005 TV series)
 Elizabeth I (2017 TV series)
 Elizabeth of Russia (1709–1762), Empress of Russia

See also
 "Elizabeth I of Scotland", Queen Elizabeth II; sometimes known as "Elizabeth I" in Scotland
 Isabel I, for the Spanish equivalent of "Elizabeth I"
 Queen Elizabeth (disambiguation)
 Queenie (Blackadder), a character in Blackadder II